Pellona is a genus of ray-finned fishes in the family Pristigasteridae. The genus contains six species. Three of these are restricted to freshwater habitats in tropical and subtropical South America, while P. dayi and P. ditchela are found in coastal waters of the Indo-Pacific, and P. harroweri is found in coastal Atlantic waters from Panama to Brazil.

Species 
 Pellona altamazonica Cope, 1872
 Pellona castelnaeana Valenciennes, 1847 (Amazon pellona)
 Pellona dayi Wongratana, 1983 (Day's pellona)
 Pellona ditchela Valenciennes, 1847 (Indian pellona)
 Pellona flavipinnis (Valenciennes, 1837) (Yellowfin river pellona)
 Pellona harroweri (Fowler, 1917) (American coastal pellona)

References

 

Pristigasteridae
Ray-finned fish genera
Taxa named by Achille Valenciennes